Cézar da Costa Oliveira (born 9 February 1973), commonly known as Cezinha, is a Brazilian retired footballer who played as a forward. He joined Chunnam Dragons in 1999 and he was Korean FA Cup top scorer in 2000.

Honours

Individual
Korean FA Cup Top Scorer Award (1): 2000

References

External links 
 

1973 births
Living people
Brazilian footballers
Association football forwards
K League 1 players
Jeonnam Dragons players
Brazilian expatriate footballers
Brazilian expatriate sportspeople in South Korea
People from Porto Velho
Sportspeople from Rondônia